Man vs Monster is the debut album from Northern Ireland trio Fighting with Wire, which was released on 10 March 2008. The band launched their album tour at the Nerve Centre in their home town, Derry on 1 December 2007.

Rock Sound placed the album at No. 71 on their Top 75 Albums of 2008 list.

Critical reception

"Everyone Needs a Nemesis" was labelled as The Hottest Record in the World Today by BBC Radio 1 DJ, Zane Lowe on January 28, 2008. When announcing the band, to amusement of fans, Lowe actually called the Irish Alt-Rock trio Fighting with Wires. The DJ has stated that having "listened and listened and listened", the album is "pretty much flawless". The band also received largely positive reviews from Rock Sound (8/10) and Kerrang! magazine.

Track listing

Single releases
"Everyone Needs a Nemesis" (2008)
"All For Nothing" (2008)
"Sugar" (2009)

References

External links
Man vs Monster on Smalltown America

Fighting with Wire albums
2008 albums